Below is a list of episodes of the animated TV series Phantom 2040.

Season 1

Season 2

References

External links
Hearst Animation

Lists of American children's animated television series episodes
Lists of French animated television series episodes
The Phantom